Ravi Murdianto (born 8 January 1995) is an Indonesian professional footballer who plays as a goalkeeper for Liga 2 club Persikab Bandung. He is also a second sergeant in the Indonesian Army.

Club career
Ravi was born in Grobogan Regency, Central Java. During his childhood, Ravi joined the SSB Putra Bersemi team. At that time, he played midfielder and striker positions. Ravi became a goalkeeper starting in the 4th grade. Posture is pretty high is a main factor. In sixth grade, Ravi joined to SSB Tugumuda Semarang to improve his skills. As a teenager, Ravi successfully passed the selection in Diklat Salatiga. Two years later, Ravi joined Diklat Ragunan and from there, his career accelerated. He was selected in Indonesia U-17 and Indonesia U-19

And then, Ravi joined to Perserang Serang in Liga Nusantara

International career
Since Ravi was selected in Indonesia U-17 and U-19 team, Ravi's role as a main goalkeeper in the junior national team is irreplaceable. Along with the Indonesian national team U-17 and U-19 Indonesia, he won in the HKFA Tournament in Hong Kong and 2013 AFF U-19 Youth Championship

Honours

International 
Indonesia U19
 AFF U-19 Youth Championship: 2013

References

External links
 
 Ravi Murdianto at Liga Indonesia

1995 births
Indonesian footballers
Living people
Sportspeople from Central Java
People from Grobogan Regency
Perserang Serang players
Mitra Kukar players
Liga 1 (Indonesia) players
Indonesia youth international footballers
Association football goalkeepers
Madura United F.C. players
PSCS Cilacap players
Persikabo 1973 players
Persela Lamongan players
Persikab Bandung players
Liga 2 (Indonesia) players